Zhang Lianmeng (born 23 January 1955) is a Chinese engineer who is a professor and former vice president of Wuhan University of Technology, and an academician of the Chinese Academy of Engineering.

Biography
He secondary studied at Zhanggang High School. He received his bachelor's degree and master's degree from Wuhan University of Technology in 1978 and 1986, respectively. He earned his doctor's degree from Tohoku University in 1996.

After university, he stayed at the university, where he was promoted to dean of the School of Materials Science and Engineering in April 1997 and vice president in May 2017.

Honours and awards
 2011 State Technological Invention Award (Second Class)
 2013 State Science and Technology Progress Award (Second Class)
 27 November 2017 Member of the Chinese Academy of Engineering (CAE)
 2017 Member of the Asia Pacific Academy of Materials

References

1955 births
Living people
People from Tianmen
Engineers from Hubei
Wuhan University of Technology alumni
Tohoku University alumni
Academic staff of Wuhan University of Technology
Members of the Chinese Academy of Engineering